German submarine U-1200 was a Type VIIC U-boat of Nazi Germany's Kriegsmarine which saw service during the Second World War.

Design
German Type VIIC submarines were preceded by the shorter Type VIIB submarines. U-1200 had a displacement of  when at the surface and  while submerged. She had two shafts and two  propellers.

U-1200 was fitted with five  torpedo tubes (four fitted at the bow and one at the stern), fourteen torpedoes, one  SK C/35 naval gun, (220 rounds), one  Flak M42 and two twin  C/30 anti-aircraft guns. The boat had a complement of between forty-four and sixty.

Service history
U-1200 keel was laid down 17 April 1943, by F. Schichau, of Danzig. She was commissioned 5 January 1944 under the command of Oberleutnant zur See Hinrich Mangels.

She was assigned to 8th U-boat Flotilla for training, before joining 11th U-boat Flotilla in Norway for operational service.

Her first war patrol, on 7 October 1944, was cut short with mechanical difficulties; she returned to Bergen on 17 October. Two days later on 19 October she set out again for her patrol area in the South-Western Approaches, south of Ireland.

Fate
U-1200 was sunk on or about 12 November 1944 in the English Channel south-east of Start Point by unknown cause. All hands lost.

Previously recorded fate
Denys Rayner. Mistaking the group, which was engaged in a slow sweep of its patrol area, for a small convoy, U-1200 attempted to stalk the group, steering on a converging course. In a swift and well-executed attack, the ships of 30 EG rounded on the U-boat and destroyed her in one depth-charge attack. There were no survivors.

References

Bibliography

 Axel Neistle: German U-Boat Losses during World War II (1998). 
 Denys Rayner: Escort:The Battle of the Atlantic (1955; reprint 1999)

External links

World War II submarines of Germany
U-boats sunk in 1944
U-boats sunk by depth charges
U-boats sunk by British warships
1943 ships
German Type VIIC submarines
Ships built by Schichau
Ships built in Danzig
Ships lost with all hands
World War II shipwrecks in the Celtic Sea
Maritime incidents in November 1944